The province of Balochistan, the least populated province of Pakistan and the largest province by area, is divided into 35 districts and seven divisions. Below, you will find an overview of the recent history of districts in Balochistan, Pakistan, a map showing each district, the divisions of Balochistan and their districts, and a list showing each district's name, the division the district belongs to, the district's area, the location of the district's headquarters, the district's population and population density (in 2017), the average annual population growth rate of each district (between 1998 and 2017), and a map showing each district's location.

History

Colonial Times

1877 - 1901

The area which covers the modern-day Pakistani province of Balochistan was first introduced to districts and divisions as administrative units under the British, and the area was first incorporated into British India in 1877. The first census of the Balochistan region was held in 1891, but it only covered the parts of Balochistan east of the 66th meridian east, was incomplete, and never had a report written about it. The first full census that was completed and had a report written on it took place in 1901. By 1901, Balochistan was divided into both the Baluchistan Agency and the Chief Commissioner's Province of Baluchistan, which was also more commonly known as British Baluchistan.

In 1901, British Baluchistan consisted principally of the areas which were under the control of Afghans, but were ceded to the British with the Treaty of Gandamak in 1879, and were formally declared British India in 1887. It was divided into two districts: Thal-Chotiali District, which consisted of the Tehsils of Duki, Shahrig (Shahrug), and Sibi, and Quetta-Pishin District, which was subdivided into Pishin Tehsil, Chaman Subdivision, and Shorarud Sub-Division.
The administration given below:

British Balochistan Province
 Thal-Chotiali District
 Duki tehsil
 Shahrig (Shahrug) tehsil
 Sibi tehsil
 Quetta-Pishin District
 Pishin Tehsil
 Chaman Subdivision
 Shorarud Sub-Division

Balochistan Agency
 Native States
 Khan of Kalat
 Kharan State
 Las bela State
 Makran State 
 British Agencies
 Bolan Agency
 Chagai Agency
 Quetta-Pishin Agency
 Thal-Chotiali Agency
 Zhob Agency
 Tribal Areas
 Bugti Country
 Marri Country

The Baluchistan Agency was split into three divisions: The areas directly administered by the British, the Native States, and the Tribal Areas.

The areas directly administered by the British consisted of the Bolan Agency, the Chagai Agency (which consisted of Chagai, Nushki, and Western Sinjrani), the Quetta-Pishin Agency (which consisted of Quetta Tehsil excluding Shorarud), the Thal-Chotiali Agency (made of the Barkhan Tehsil, the Kohlu Sub-Tehsil, and the Sanjawi (Sinjawi) Sub-Tehsil), and the Zhob Agency (which included Fort Sandeman, Hindobagh, Loralai, Musakhel, and Qilla Saifullah Tehsils).

There were four autonomous princely states, making up the native states, in Balochistan: The state of Kharan (which was a vassal of Qalat), The state of Las Bela, The state of Makran, and the Khanate of Qalat (which was divided into Domki, Kaheri, and Umrani Country; Jhalawan Country; Kachhi Country; Nasirabad Niabat; and Sarawan Country).

The two tribal areas were Bugti Country and Marri Country. The tribal areas consisted of Baloch tribes which, as per the census report of 1901, exhibited "nomadic tendency to the largest degree".

This meant that the administrative setup of the Balochistan region under British control was as follows in 1901:

Territories which do not exist anymore
 British Baluchistan
 Quetta-Pishin District
 Thal-Chotiali District
 Baluchistan Agency
 Quetta-Pishin Agency
 Thal-Chotiali Agency
 Bolan Agency
 Chagai Agency
 Zhob Agency
 Tribal Areas
 Bugti Country
 Marri Country
 Native Princely States
 State of Makrann
 Kharan (princely state)
 Las Bela (princely state)
 Khanate of Qalat

1901 - 1947

By the time of the 1911 census, all the directly administered territories of the Baluchistan Agency had been abolished and reformed into districts in the Chief Commissioner's Province (British Baluchistan). Thal-Chotiali District was also abolished. In their place came the six districts of Bolan (previously Bolan Agency), Chagai (previously Chagai Agency), Loralai (previously parts of Thal-Chotiali District and Thal-Chotiali Agency), Quetta-Pishin (previously Quetta-Pishin District and Quetta-Pishin Agency), Sibi (previously parts of Thal-Chotiali District and Thal-Chotiali Agency), and Zhob (previously Zhob Agency). The two Tribal Areas of Bugti Country and Marri Country were also abolished as a separate unit and were made a part of Sibi District called Marri-Bugti Country (which became known the unadministered area of Sibi District, as opposed to the administered areas which covered parts of Thal-Chotiali District and Thal-Chotiali Agency).

No changes occurred to the administrative setup of the Native Princely States, which now made up the entire Baluchistan Agency until 1940, when the State of Kharan gained complete independence from the Khanate of Qalat. This did not, though, have any effect on the borders and administrative units of the borders themselves, as the State of Kharan already existed as an entity before. The only difference was now it was completely separate from Qalat.

This left the following administrative setup, which would see no changes through the 1921, 1931, and 1941 censuses, all the way until Pakistani independence:

Territories which do not exist anymore
 British Baluchistan
 Quetta-Pishin District
 Bolan District
 Chagai District
 Loralai District
 Sibi District
 Zhob District
 Unadmistration Areas of Sibi District 
 Marri-Bugti Country
 Native Princely States
 State of Makran
 Kharan (princely state)
 Las Bela (princely state)
 Khanate of Kalat

Post-Independence

1947-1955 
On 3 October 1952, the four princely states of Kalat, Kharan, Las Bela and Makran was merged to form Balochistan State Union with the capital at the town of Kalat.

Administration of Balochistan  
 Quetta Division 
 Quetta-Pishin District
 Bolan District
 Chagai District
 Loralai District
 Sibi District
 Zhob District
 Unadmistration Areas of Sibi District 
 Marri-Bugti Country
 Balochistan State Union 
 State of Makran
 Kharan (princely state)
 Las Bela (princely state)
 Khanate of Kalat

On 14 October 1955, the Balochistan state union finally merged into Balochistan Province to form Kalat division and Marri-Bugti county abolished.

Administration is given below;
 Quetta Division 
Quetta-Pishin District
Bolan District
Chagai District
Loralai District
Sibi District
Zhob District
 Kalat Division 
Kalat District
Makran District
Kharan District
Lasbela District

1955 -1970 
In 30 September 1955, To diminish the differences between the two regions, claimed the government, the 'One Unit' programme merged the four provinces of West Pakistan into a single province to parallel the province of East Pakistan (now Bangladesh).

1970 - 1998 
On 1 July 1970, West Pakistan was abolished and all four provinces of Pakistan were restored as 1947.

The administration as given below:
Quetta Division
Quetta-Pashin District
Bolan District
Chagai District
Loralai District
Sibi District
Zhob District
Kalat Division
Kalat District
Makran District
Kharan District

In 1974, Balochistan government create three new districts Khuzdar and Nasirabad District by bifurcation of Kalat District, Kohlu district from Sibi district and Sibi division created from Quetta division. 

In 1975, Pishin District was separated from Quetta District and Lasbela district transferred from Karachi division to Kalat division(From 1970 to 1975 Lasbela district was a part of Sindh province).

On 1st July 1977, Makran was declared a division and was divided into three districts, named Panjgur, Turbat and Gwadar. 

In July 1983, Dera Bugti was established as a separate district .

In 1986, Ziarat District was established, previously being part of Sibi District.

In 1987, Jafarabad was notified a district.district’s headquarters are at Dera Allah Yar, also known as Jhatpat among locals and Nasirabad division created by bifurcation of Sibi division.

In 1988, Killa Saifullah District was established as a district by bifurcation of  Zhob District and Zhob division established after bifurcating of Quetta division.

In December 1991, Mastung creation as a separate district from Kalat District and Barkhan district from Loralai district.

In December 1991, Bolan district divided into two districts New Bolan (Kachhi)and Bolan (Jhal Magsi) district.

In 11 November 1992, Awaran District was created as a separate district from Khuzdar District and Musakhail district from Loralai district.

In May 1992, Old Kachhi district renamed to Jhal Magsi.

In June 1993, Kila Abdullah was separated from Pishin District and made a new district.

In 1994- 95, the name of Turbat district was changed to its old name Kech.

The administration as given below:
Quetta Division
Quetta District
Pashin District
Killa Abdullah District
Chagai District
Zhob Division
Zhob District
Killa Saifullah District
Musakhel District
Loralai District
Barkhan District
Kalat Division
Kalat District
Khuzdar District
Awaran District
Kharan District
Lasbela District
Mustang District
Sibi Division
Sibi District
Kohlu District
Dera Bugti District
Ziarat District
Nasirabad Division
Nasirabad District
 Jhal Magsi District (Formally Bolan)
Kachhi District(Formally New Bolan)
Jafarabad District
Makran Division
Kech (Turbat) District
Gwadar District
Punjgur District

1998 - 2017

At the time of the 1998 Census of Pakistan, Balochistan had 26 districts, but since then, the province has created 12 new districts and abolished 01 district.

In 2004, Nushki was separated from Chaghai and made a district.

In 2005, the tehsil of Washuk received district status after splitting off from the district of Kharan, and became Washuk District.

Sherani District was established 3 January 2006 by the bifurcation of Zhob district.

In 2007, Harnai district would be created by splitting the Sibi district .

In 2013, two new districts were created Lehri district created by splitting of Sibi District and Sohbatpur District created by splitting of Jafarabad district.

In 2016, Duki district created.

In 2017, Surab District creation as a separate district, Surab was part of Kalat District and Rakhshan division established after bifurcating of Kalat and Quetta division.

The administration as given below:
Quetta Division
Quetta District
Pashin District
Killa Abdullah District
Zhob Division
Zhob District
Killa Saifullah District
Musakhel District
Loralai District
Barkhan District
Sherani District
Duki District
Kalat Division
Kalat District
Khuzdar District
Awaran District
Lasbela District
Mustang District
Surab District(Sikanderabad)
Sibi Division
Sibi District
Kohlu District
Dera Bugti District
Ziarat District
Harnai District
Lehri District
Nasirabad Division
Nasirabad District
 Jhal Magsi District (Formally Bolan)
Kachhi District(Formally New Bolan)
Jafarabad District
Sohbatpur District
Makran Division
Kech (Turbat) District
Gwadar District
Punjgur District
Rakhshan Division
Kharan District
Chagai District
Nushki District
Washuk District

2018 - Present

In 2018, Balochistan Cabinet abolished or reannexed Lehri district into Sibi district.

In 2021, Chaman District is created after bifurcating Qila Abdullah District and Loralai division was created after bifurcating of Zhob division.

In 2022, Balochistan Cabinet Create 3 new districts Hub district from Lasbela, Usta Muhammad district from Jafarabad and Karezat district from Pashin district. 

The administration as given below:
Quetta Division
Quetta District
Pashin District
Killa Abdullah District
Chaman District
Karezat District
Zhob Division
Zhob District
Killa Saifullah District
Sherani District
Loralai Division
Loralai District
Musakhel District
Barkhan District
Duki District
Kalat Division
Kalat District
Khuzdar District
Awaran District
Lasbela District
Hub District
Mustang District
Surab District(Sikanderabad)
Sibi Division
Sibi District
Kohlu District
Dera Bugti District
Ziarat District
Harnai District
Nasirabad Division
Nasirabad District
 Jhal Magsi District (Formally Bolan)
Kachhi District(Formally New Bolan)
Jafarabad District
Sohbatpur District
Usta Muhammad District
Makran Division
Kech (Turbat) District
Gwadar District
Punjgur District
Rakhshan Division
Kharan District
Chagai District
Nushki District
Washuk District

List of Districts

Former district
 Lehri District abolished in 2018.
 Karezat-Barshore District created on 21 November 2022,on 22 November Barshore tehsil minus from krezat-barshore District and barshore tehsil merge again in pishin district Later on 29 November 2022 Balochistan Government Abolished Karezat District.

See also
 List of tehsils of Balochistan
 Districts of Khyber Pakhtunkhwa
 Districts of Gilgit-Baltistan

Notes

References

Balochistan
Districts of Balochistan, Pakistan